Jay Belasco (January 11, 1888 May 1, 1949), born Reginald James Belasco, was an American film actor whose career mostly involved silent film. Belasco was born in Brooklyn, New York, and was a cousin of actors Walter Belasco and David Belasco. He died from a heart attack on May 1, 1949, in Santa Monica, California.

Filmography

References

External links

American male silent film actors
Male actors from New York City
1888 births
1949 deaths
20th-century American male actors
Burials at Woodlawn Memorial Cemetery, Santa Monica
People from Brooklyn